Araujuzon is a commune in the Pyrénées-Atlantiques department in the Nouvelle-Aquitaine region of southwestern France.

The inhabitants of the commune are known as Araujuzonais or Araujuzonaises.

Geography

Location
The town is located some 40 km north-west of Oloron-Sainte-Marie, 15 km east by south-east of Sauveterre-de-Béarn, and 8 km north-west of Navarrenx.

Access
Araujuzon is accessed by the D936 road from Oloron-Sainte-Marie which passes through the north of the commune and continues west to Autevielle-Saint-Martin-Bideren. There is also the D160 road from the southern border where it joins the D115 passing through the length of the commune to the D936 west of the village. The D265 road also links the north of the commune to Narp. The village is close to the D936 and can be reached by a number of country roads.

The Intercity network of Pyrénées-Atlantiques bus network currently has a stop in the commune on Route 850 from Oloron-Sainte-Marie to Sauveterre-de-Béarn.

Hydrography
Located in the Drainage basin of the Adour, the northern border of the commune is formed by the Gave d'Oloron (a tributary of the Gave de Pau River) with its tributary, the Lausset, passing through the commune and joining the Gave d'Oleron near the village. The Ruisseau de la Mousquere rises in the commune and gathers several tributaries while flowing north-west to join the Gave d'Oleron.

The Cassou dou Boue and the Ruisseau de Lescuncette rise in the south of the commune and flow south-east to join the Ruisseau de Harcellane (a tributary of the Lausset).

Localities and hamlets

 Les Arreytes
 Les Balibes
 Beighau
 Bernatha
 Boulocq
 La Campagne
 Le Coude du Lausset
 Gaillégou
 Lacroix
 Lahagne
 Lahore
 Lamazou
 Larcebeau
 Larmanou
 Lavie
 Lavoignet
 Loustalot
 Moncau
 Pessot
 Serrailh
 Souleret
 Trescassous

Neighbouring communes and villages

Toponymy

The name of the commune in Béarnese is Araus-Juzon (according to classical norm of Occitan). The commune name in Gascon is Lajuson.

For Michel Grosclaude, the name comes from lau ("wasteland" or "moor") and juzon ("lower" or "downstream"). Brigitte Jobbé-Duval indicated that Juzon meaning "underneath" gives the place name translating as "underneath Arrau", but more likely "underneath Araux" (Araux is called Araus-Susonin Béarnese).

The following table details the origins of the commune name and other names in the commune.

Sources:

Raymond: Topographic Dictionary of the Department of Basses-Pyrenees, 1863, on the page numbers indicated in the table. 
Grosclaude: Toponymic Dictionary of communes, Béarn, 2006 
Cassini: Cassini Map from 1750
Ldh/EHESS/Cassini: 

Origins:

Fors de Béarn
Establishments: Register of Establishments of Béarn
Reformation: Reformation of Béarn
Insinuations: Insinuations of the Diocese of Oloron

History
Paul Raymond noted on page 8 of the 1863 dictionary that the commune had a Lay Abbey which was a vassal of the Viscounty of Béarn. In 1385 Araujuzon had 46 fires and depended on the Bailiwick of Navarrenx. It became a dependency of the Barony of Jasses from 1644 which included Araujuzon, Araux, Jasses, Montfort, and Viellenave. In 1790 the commune was part of the Canton of Sauveterre.

Heraldry

Administration

List of Successive Mayors

Inter-communality
The commune is part of nine inter-communal structures:
 the Communauté de communes du Béarn des Gaves
 the mixed association Bil Ta Garbi
 the mixed association of Béarn des Gaves
 the inter-communal association of Gaves and of Saleys
 the association of Gaves Country and of Lausset
 the association of schools of Gaveausset
 the association for promotion of Navarrenx
 the AEP association of Navarrenx
 the Energy association of Pyrénées-Atlantiques

Araujuzon is also part of the Pays de Lacq Orthez Béarn des Gaves.

Demography
In 2017 the commune had 194 inhabitants.

Economy
Economic activity is mainly agricultural (livestock, pastures, corn). The town is part of the Appellation d'origine contrôlée (AOC) zone of Ossau-iraty.

Facilities

The commune has an elementary school.

See also
Communes of the Pyrénées-Atlantiques department

References

External links
Araujuzon official website 
Araujuzon on the 1750 Cassini Map

Communes of Pyrénées-Atlantiques